Sokolenko is a Ukrainian surname.

This surname is shared by the following people:

 Andriy Sokolenko (born 1978), Ukrainian football defender
 Konstantin Sokolenko (born 1987), Kazakhstani Nordic combined skier
 Valeriy Sokolenko (born 1982), Ukrainian footballer

See also
 

Ukrainian-language surnames